The Christian National Front (KNF) was a political party in Hungary during the 1930s.

History
The party won a single seat in the 1935 elections, They did not contest any further elections.

References

Defunct political parties in Hungary